Neta C. Crawford (born 1961) is an American political scientist. She is Montague Burton Chair in International Relations at the University of Oxford and holds a Professorial Fellowship at Balliol College. Crawford previously served as professor and chair of the Department of Political Science at the Boston University College of Arts and Sciences in Boston, Massachusetts.

Crawford co-founded the Costs of War Project with anthropologist Catherine Lutz in 2010 and currently serves alongside Lutz and Stephanie Savell as a project co-director.

Education and career 
Crawford received her Bachelor of Arts from Brown University in 1985, where she pursued an independent concentration entitled "The War System and Alternatives to Militarism." She earned her doctorate in political science from the Massachusetts Institute of Technology, graduating in 1992. From 1994 to 1996, Crawford completed a post-doctoral fellowship at Brown's Watson Institute for International and Public Affairs. After teaching at the University of Massachusetts, Amherst, she returned to Brown as an associate and later adjunct professor. In 2005, she was appointed Professor of Political Science at Boston University.

In 2010, Crawford co-founded the Costs of War Project with the goal of documenting the direct and indirect human and financial costs of the War on Terror. The project released its first findings in June 2011 and has published continuously since. The project is the most extensive and comprehensive public accounting of the cost of post-September 11th U.S. military operations compiled to date.

Since October 2017, Crawford has served on the board of the nuclear non-proliferation advocacy organization, Council for a Livable World. She serves on the editorial boards of The Journal of Political Philosophy and Global Perspectives.

In 2021, Crawford was appointed Montague Burton Professor of International Relations at the University of Oxford.

Personal life 
Crawford is black and Native American. She is a lesbian.

Books

References

External links 
 

Brown University alumni
Massachusetts Institute of Technology alumni
University of Massachusetts Amherst faculty
Brown University faculty
Boston University faculty
American women political scientists
American political scientists
African-American political scientists
LGBT African Americans
21st-century African-American women
21st-century African-American people
Living people
1961 births